Tōhō Maru may refer to:

 , launched in 1936 and sunk in 1943
 , launched in 1944 and sunk in 1945

Ship names